Robert Scott Dewar  (born 10 June 1949), is a retired British diplomat who was previously the British Ambassador to Ethiopia and Madagascar and High Commissioner to Mozambique and Nigeria.

He has served as the UK Permanent Representative to the African Union (2004-2006) and the UK Permanent Representative to the Economic Community of West African States (2007-2011). He was a member of board of trustees of the British Red Cross until 2019. He was made a member of the Order of St Michael and St George in 2006.

References

1949 births
Living people
Ambassadors of the United Kingdom to Madagascar
High Commissioners of the United Kingdom to Mozambique
High Commissioners of the United Kingdom to Nigeria
Ambassadors of the United Kingdom to Ethiopia